Network Description Language (NDL) is a tool to reduce the complexity as networks evolve into the future.  NDL enables both humans and machines to have a better grasp on today’s highly evolved networks to ease time consuming and tedious tasks being performed by humans. Through the use of Resource Description Framework (RDF), researchers have been able to create an ontology for complex networks, thus creating a clear view of any network.

NDL has proven itself useful in solving many issues as it pertains to the operation of hybrid networks, allowing the creation of network maps and facilitating path finding algorithms. SURFnet6, a Dutch national research and education network was one such network that has utilized NDL for lightpath and IP service planning.

External links
SNE NDL
IEEE Xplore - Using the Network Description Language in Optical Networks

Network theory
Hardware description languages